The 1954 Missouri Tigers football team was an American football team that represented the University of Missouri in the Big Seven Conference (Big 7) during the 1954 college football season. The team compiled a 4–5–1 record (3–2–1 against Big 7 opponents), finished in a tie for third place in the Big 7, and was outscored by its opponents by a combined total of 261 to 198. Don Faurot was the head coach for the 17th of 19 seasons. The team played its home games at Memorial Stadium in Columbia, Missouri.

The team's statistical leaders included Robert Bauman with 293 rushing yards, Vic Eaton with 774 passing yards and 688 yards of total offense, Harold Burnine with 405 receiving yards, and Jack Fox with 47 points scored.

Schedule

References

Missouri
Missouri Tigers football seasons
Missouri Tigers football